Renewal is a quarterly British left-wing political magazine published by Lawrence and Wishart.

History
Renewal was established in 1993 as the magazine of the Labour Coordinating Committee in the wake of the Labour Party's fourth successive election defeat. Under the editorship of Neal Lawson and Paul Thompson, it established itself as an influential forum for debate among Labour Party "modernisers". Over time its editors took an increasingly critical approach towards Tony Blair's leadership of the Labour Party and were instrumental in the foundation of the pressure group Compass.

In 2007, Martin McIvor took over as editor. In 2012, Ben Jackson took over as editor. In 2016, Florence Sutcliffe-Braithwaite and James Stafford took over as editors. In the early-mid 2010s, the journal carried articles from such authors as Lord Stewart Wood, Lisa Nandy MP, and Rachel Reeves and Martin McIvor, and interviews with Frances O'Grady, and Thomas Piketty.

References

External links

Neal Lawson and Paul Thompson write on Renewal's ten year anniversary
David Coates writes on Gordon Brown in Renewal's 2007 relaunch issue

English-language magazines
Magazines established in 1993
Political magazines published in the United Kingdom
Quarterly magazines published in the United Kingdom
Socialist magazines